Eustace James Newton (October 26, 1877 – May 14, 1931) was an American Major League Baseball (MLB) pitcher who played for several teams in both the National League and American League. He finished with a 54–72 win–loss record, a 3.22 earned run average (ERA), and 99 complete games.

Early life
Newton was born in Indianapolis. An article in the Sporting Life magazine from April 1907 said he played college baseball for Morris Hall University, while others claim Morris Halo, or Morris Hale.  The most likely match is Moores Hill College, a school that closed in 1915.

Career
Doc began his MLB career in  when he played for the Cincinnati Reds.  He was in the regular pitching rotation that first season, but finished with a 9–15 win–loss record, and 4.14 ERA.  The  season wasn't much better for Newton, as he began the same effectiveness as the previous season.  After 20 games, his win–loss record was 4-13, and his ERA was 4.12.  The Reds decided to release him from the team on July 13 of that season, and he was signed by the Brooklyn Superbas three days later.  Newton set the single-season NL record for errors by a pitcher (since 1900) with 17 for Cincinnati and Brooklyn in 1901.

With this new scenery, he pitched well to finish off that 1901 season, winning six games, and keeping his ERA a low 2.83.  The  season, still with Brooklyn, proved to be his best Major League season, as he had a 15–14 win–loss record, a 2.42 ERA, along with 26 complete games, and four shutouts.

During a stretch of two months, starting August 7, he won 11 games in a row, including a no-hitter on November 8 against the Oakland Oaks. It was the first no-hitter ever tossed in the PCL. Later, in 1904, he won 39 games. A researcher as uncovered another game in 1903 that, by the governing rules of the day, gives Newton an added victory in 1903, bringing his record up to 35–12.

On October 4, the New York Highlanders selected Newton the Rule 5 draft. He pitched well, just not well enough to win games on a regular basis. His ERAs were low during his time in New York, 2.96, but his win–loss records did not match it, 20–25.  His manager in New York, Clark Griffith, said that the Highlanders failed to win the  pennant because of Newton's lack of physical conditioning; Newton had been suspended mid-season for dissipation.

Post-career
Newton died in Memphis, Tennessee, at the age of 53, and is interred at Crown Hill Cemetery in Indianapolis.

References

External links

1877 births
1931 deaths
Major League Baseball pitchers
Baseball players from Indianapolis
Cincinnati Reds players
Brooklyn Superbas players
New York Highlanders players
Burials at Crown Hill Cemetery
Minor league baseball managers
Norfolk Jewels players
Reading Coal Heavers players
Indianapolis Hoosiers (minor league) players
Los Angeles Angels (minor league) players
Portland Browns players
Montreal Royals players
Newark Indians players
Toronto Maple Leafs (International League) players
Memphis Turtles players
Memphis Chickasaws players
Chattanooga Lookouts players
19th-century baseball players
Tifton Tilters players